Peter Prendergast (born September 23, 1963) is a football referee from Jamaica. A FIFA referee since January 1, 1994, his first international match was USA against Ireland, on June 9, 1996. Since then he has refereed many matches in the CONCACAF Gold Cup, the Olympics, the FIFA World Cup and the Confederations Cup. Prendergast also refereed Costa Rica - United States (2-1) in the qualification stages for the same World Cup.

At the 2002 FIFA World Cup, Prendergast made the call during the Brazil vs Belgium round of 16 match to not acknowledge a goal made by Marc Wilmots.

Prendergast is bilingual, able to speak Spanish as well as his native English.

References

External links
  Profile

1963 births
Living people
Jamaican football referees
FIFA World Cup referees
2002 FIFA World Cup referees
CONCACAF Gold Cup referees
CONCACAF Champions League referees